Dojlidy is one of the districts of the Polish city of Białystok, formerly a village and farmlands. It is also known for its brewery, plywood factory (Fabryka Sklejek Biaform SA) and the Dojlidy fish ponds and recreation areas on the White River reservoirs. Until 1954 there was a Gmina Dojlidy, after which point it was incorporated into the city. Dojlidy term probably comes from the name of the tribe of Baltic peoples residing in these lands for centuries. In contrast to Bialystok, which until 1795 was part of the Crown, Dojlidy, belonged to the Grand Duchy of Lithuania.

Name
The term Dojlidy probably comes from the Lithuanian word "dailidė" meaning carpenter, which makes it possible to speculate that Dojlidy was a settlement of carpenters, which in turn is confirmed by the forest character of the area. This concept was presented by prof. Michał Kondratiuk. A similar origin of the name Dojlid is also indicated by Andrzej Danieluk, underlining the Old Belarusian root of the word "dojlida" meaning carpenter (in modern Belarusian "дойлід" means "architect").

Facilities and green spaces
 Neoclassical palace Rüdigerów (19th century) and the park, now the seat of government for the Higher School of Public Administration
 Neo-Renaissance palace Hasbacha (19th century) containing offices for:
Regional Centre for Research and Documentation of Monuments
Regional Office for the Protection of Monuments in Białystok
Polish Heritage Conservation Workshops SA, a division of Bialystok
a settlement near the factory floor Hasbacha
Bialystok WOPR
Podlaskie Province by WOPR
Scientific Society of Bialystok
Business Club of Podlaski
The Foundation for Polish Green Lungs
 Collegium Novum WSAP
 District Hospital
 Airport Krywlany Sports
Aeroclub of Bialystok
 Forest and Communal Solnicki
 Dojlidy (est. 1769)
 Plywood Industry Plant "Biaform"
 Church. Christ the King
 Church. Immaculate Heart of Mary
 Orthodox Church. St. Ilia and the Orthodox cemetery

 Ponds Dojlidzkie
 Lagoon Dojlidy
 a Sports Club MOSiR at Urban Beach
 Allotments
 Green City
 District Office
 Secondary School No. 8 - st. Crane 12
 Library branch of the Library Podlaska No. 11 (in the building of the Secondary School No. 8) - st. Crane 12
 Agricultural Schools
 Public School No. 31, Primary School No. 52
 Social II High School, Middle School No. 1 Social
 Tennis Association "Stanley" of Tennis Courts
 Internal Security Agency Branch in Bialystok

A description of district boundaries prior to 1 January 2006
From the administrative boundary of the city street Viaduct, by the Square 10 Lithuanian Cavalry Regiment, of street Nowowarszawskiej K. Tsiolkovsky, Nowowarszawską, Dojnowską to the administrative border of the city, along the border of the forest and the shores of the lagoon Dojlidzkiego, a piece of beach along the street, including Orthodox cemetery and church, a piece of street Suchowolca, then a piece of street Dojlidy top, then the eastern access to the brewery pond przybrowarnego, Solnička street, and beyond, surround Forest Solnicki, administrative boundary of the city, back to the road bridge.

Streets and squares located within the settlements (before 1 January 2006)
Bartnicza, Beavers, Stork, Badger, Konstantin Tsiolkovsky-even 2/2-12C, Dojnowska-even, Dojlidy Factory-odd, even from 1913 to the end, Jaskolcza, Deer, Cormorants, Crete, Rabbit, Fr. Stanislaus Suchowolca, Kuropatwiana, Swan, Elk, John Michalowski, Adam Mickiewicz University building 106-odd, odd 95-95F, Hunting, Bear, Nowowarszawska-odd 116–128, Pavia, even Plażowa-88 C-88D, the Birds, Rondo 10 Regiment Lithuanian Lancers, Lynx, Sarnia, sepia, nightingale, Sokol, joint-odd 2-14, odd 1-37/1, Ostrich, Szpacza, Tiger, Viaduct-odd, Squirrel, Wolf, Hare, Turtle, Bison, Crane.

References

External links

Districts of Białystok